The Tale of the Princess Kaguya may refer to:

The Tale of the Bamboo Cutter, a 9th or 10th century Japanese story
The Tale of the Princess Kaguya (film), a 2013 film based on the story